"Make Me a Song" is a song by American singer Kiley Dean. It was written by Candice Nelson, Walter "Lil Walt" Millsap and Timbaland for her unreleased debut album Simple Girl, while production was helmed by the latter, with additional production by Scott Storch. The song references "Rock the Boat" (2001) by American R&B singer Aaliyah. Due to the inclusion of the sample, Stephen "Static Major" Garrett, Eric Seats, and Rapture Stewart are also credited as songwriters. A rhythmic and lyrical push and pull in which Dean describes her journey to the studio to find the perfect melody and beat, it also references to Aaliyah's "Young Nation", Missy Elliott's "Get Ur Freak On", Tweet's "Call Me" and Bubba Sparxxx's "Hootnanny". "Make Me a Song" peaked at number 99 on the US Billboard Hot 100.

Music video
In the video, Dean goes throughout her day in the studio. Two versions of the video were released: a TV version and an internet version. Timbaland, Missy Elliott, Bubba Sparxxx and Brandy make cameos in the video.

Track listing

Credits and personnel
Credits lifted from the liner notes of "Make Me a Song."

 

Kiley Dean – backing vocals, lead vocals, writer
Jimmy Douglass – recording engineer
Aaron Fessel – recording engineer
Brian "Big Bass" Gardner – mastering
Stephen Garrett – writer
Tim "Timbaland" Mosley – backing vocals, producer, writer
 
Candice Nelson – writer
Eric Seats – writer
Rapture Stewart – writer
Scott Storch – co-producer
Anthony Zeller – recording engineer assistant

Charts

References

2003 singles
Kiley Dean songs
Song recordings produced by Timbaland
Songs written by Timbaland
Songs written by Candice Nelson (songwriter)
2003 songs
Interscope Records singles